Carapook is a small town in Victoria, Australia. It is located not far from Casterton.

References

Coastal towns in Victoria (Australia)
Towns in Victoria (Australia)